Charline Mignot (born 20 April 1995), better known as Vendredi sur Mer (French for "Friday by the Sea"), is a Swiss singer-songwriter and photographer.

Biography 
Charline Mignot was born in Romandy, a Francophone part of Switzerland, where she lived until she moved to Lyon where she attended an art school. She began her career as a photographer, notably working with the French luxury goods manufacturer, Hermès. Inspired by a meeting with her manager who appraised her homemade song made with a friend, she decided to take her first steps in the music industry. She settled in Paris and adopted a pseudonym Vendredi sur Mer. "I wanted a name that invites you to a voyage, to poetry, to reverie," she explained, adding that it's the sea that she draws most inspiration from.

Composed by Lewis OfMan, her first EP Marée basse was released in November 2017. In 2019, she released her first studio album called Premiers émois.

Reception 
The cultural magazine PopMatters likened Mignot's work to that of the French band La Femme.

References 

1995 births
Living people
21st-century Swiss women singers
Photographers from Geneva
Musicians from Geneva
Swiss expatriates in France